The Ravenna Motor Vehicle Service Building, at 512 Main St. in Ravenna, Kentucky, is a Modern Movement-style Kentucky National Guard building constructed in 1949.  It was listed on the United States National Register of Historic Places in 2000.

It is a one-and-a-half-story red brick building with a large garage door centered on each of its ends.  It is adjacent to the old Ravenna Armory, and was used as a storage facility for military vehicles and equipment.

See also 
 Bowling Green Organizational Maintenance Shop No. 10

References

National Register of Historic Places in Estill County, Kentucky
Government buildings completed in 1949
1949 establishments in Kentucky
Modern Movement architecture in the United States
Modernist architecture in Kentucky
Kentucky National Guard
Motor vehicle maintenance
Government buildings on the National Register of Historic Places in Kentucky